Mont Alto State Park is a Pennsylvania state park on  in Quincy Township, Franklin County, Pennsylvania in the United States. The park is on Pennsylvania Route 233 one mile from Mont Alto.

History

Mont Alto Iron Company
Mont Alto State Park is the oldest state park in Pennsylvania. Its history began with the former Mont Alto Iron Furnace, a blast furnace built in 1807. The area was a center of iron production for many years. The Mont Alto Railroad was built by the Mont Alto Iron Company to connect the furnaces of the area to the Cumberland Valley Railroad near Chambersburg. This railroad served a dual purpose, carrying iron shipments from the furnace and bringing visitors to Mont Alto Park. The park was opened by the Mont Alto Iron Company. Ownership of Mont Alto Park was transferred to the Commonwealth of Pennsylvania on May 1, 1902.

The First State Park 
Mont Alto Park became the first "state forest park" in Pennsylvania. The park had a swimming pool, refreshment stand, hiking trails and a carousel. It was also the site of South Mountain Camp Sanitorium. This sanitorium was founded by Dr. Joseph Rothrock, a medical doctor and forester who opened several sanitoriums in the forests of Pennsylvania and became known as the father of forestry in Pennsylvania. The sanitorium treated those afflicted with tuberculosis and other respiratory illnesses. Over the years the park has gradually become less and less of a destination for visitors. It is now a quiet park with minimal facilities. The building that housed the carousel, which now serves as a picnic pavilion, is a reminder of the past.

Recreation
The West Branch Antietam Creek flows through Mont Alto State Park and provides visitors to the park to fish for trout. Logging and forest management roads provide access to hiking opportunities in the nearby Michaux State Forest. There are two picnic areas with approximately 50 tables and two pavilions, one being the former carousel house. The park also provides parking and restroom facilities for hunters and other outdoorsman that venture into Michaux State Forest.

Nearby state parks
The following state parks are within  of Mont Alto State Park:
Big Spring State Forest Picnic Area (Perry County)
Buchanan's Birthplace State Park (Franklin County)
Caledonia State Park (Adams and Franklin Counties)
Colonel Denning State Park (Cumberland County)
Cowans Gap State Park (Fulton County)
Cunningham Falls State Park (Maryland)
Fowlers Hollow State Park (Perry County)
Gambrill State Park (Maryland)
Gathland State Park (Maryland)
Greenbrier State Park (Maryland)
Kings Gap Environmental Education and Training Center (Cumberland County)
Pine Grove Furnace State Park (Cumberland County)
South Mountain State Park (Maryland)
Washington Monument State Park (Maryland)

References

External links

  

State parks of Pennsylvania
Parks in Franklin County, Pennsylvania
Protected areas established in 1902
1902 establishments in Pennsylvania
Protected areas of Franklin County, Pennsylvania